Diligence is a behavior or work ethic with a belief that work is good in itself; also considered a virtue.

Diligence may also refer to:

 Due diligence, a legal concept
 Diligence (Scots law), a legal process in Scots law
 Operational due diligence, review process for potential mergers and acquisitions
 Management due diligence, an evaluation of each individual's effectiveness in contributing to the organization's strategic objectives

Ships:
 RFA Diligence (A132), a fleet repair ship of the Royal Fleet Auxiliary
 USCGC Diligence (WMEC-616), a U.S. Coast Guard medium endurance cutter
 USRC Diligence, one of the first ten cutters operated by the United States' Revenue Cutter Service
 ST Diligent, a tug operated by the Admiralty between 1947 and 1961.

See also
 Diligence (vehicle), a type of four-wheeled enclosed coach
 De Vlijt (disambiguation) (Dutch for "The Diligence"), a name given to some windmills in the Netherlands
 La Diligence (restaurant), a Michelin-starred restaurant in Beek, Netherlands
 La Diligence (comics), an album in the Lucky Luke comics series